Ekaterina Makarova and Elena Vesnina were the defending champions, but lost in the second round to Julie Coin and Pauline Parmentier.

Hsieh Su-wei and Peng Shuai won the title, defeating Sara Errani and Roberta Vinci in the final, 6–4, 6–1.

Seeds

Main draw

Finals

Top half

Section 1

Section 2

Bottom half

Section 3 
{{16TeamBracket-Compact-Tennis3
| RD1=First round
| RD2=Second round
| RD3=Third round
| RD4=Quarterfinals

| RD1-seed01=8
| RD1-team01= J Görges A-L Grönefeld
| RD1-score01-1=5
| RD1-score01-2=6
| RD1-score01-3=5
| RD1-seed02=
| RD1-team02= D Cibulková K Flipkens 
| RD1-score02-1=7
| RD1-score02-2=2
| RD1-score02-3=7

| RD1-seed03=
| RD1-team03= M Keys A Riske
| RD1-score03-1=2
| RD1-score03-2=6
| RD1-score03-3=6
| RD1-seed04=WC
| RD1-team04= I Ramialison C Sibille
| RD1-score04-1=6
| RD1-score04-2=3
| RD1-score04-3=3

| RD1-seed05=
| RD1-team05= L Hradecká M Krajicek
| RD1-score05-1=6
| RD1-score05-2=6
| RD1-score05-3=
| RD1-seed06=
| RD1-team06= F Schiavone S Soler Espinosa
| RD1-score06-1=4
| RD1-score06-2=3
| RD1-score06-3=

| RD1-seed07=
| RD1-team07=
| RD1-score07-1=6
| RD1-score07-2=6
| RD1-score07-3=
| RD1-seed08=11
| RD1-team08=
| RD1-score08-1=4
| RD1-score08-2=2
| RD1-score08-3=

| RD1-seed09=16
| RD1-team09= M Erakovic A Parra Santonja
| RD1-score09-1=78
| RD1-score09-2=6
| RD1-score09-3=
| RD1-seed10=PR
| RD1-team10= K Jans-Ignacik M Zanevska
| RD1-score10-1=66
| RD1-score10-2=4
| RD1-score10-3=

| RD1-seed11=
| RD1-team11= R Olaru D Vekić
| RD1-score11-1=1
| RD1-score11-2=6
| RD1-score11-3=1
| RD1-seed12=
| RD1-team12= K Barrois A Beck
| RD1-score12-1=6
| RD1-score12-2=1
| RD1-score12-3=6

| RD1-seed13=PR
| RD1-team13= I Buryachok V Uhlířová
| RD1-score13-1=3
| RD1-score13-2=3
| RD1-score13-3=
| RD1-seed14=WC
| RD1-team14= J Coin P Parmentier
| RD1-score14-1=6
| RD1-score14-2=6
| RD1-score14-3=

| RD1-seed15=WC
| RD1-team15= A Collombon C Paquet
| RD1-score15-1=2
| RD1-score15-2=3
| RD1-score15-3=
| RD1-seed16=3
| RD1-team16= E Makarova E Vesnina
| RD1-score16-1=6
| RD1-score16-2=6
| RD1-score16-3=

| RD2-seed01=
| RD2-team01= D Cibulková K Flipkens
| RD2-score01-1=
| RD2-score01-2=
| RD2-score01-3=
| RD2-seed02=
| RD2-team02= M Keys A Riske
| RD2-score02-1=w/o
| RD2-score02-2=
| RD2-score02-3=

| RD2-seed03=
| RD2-team03= L Hradecká M Krajicek
| RD2-score03-1=6
| RD2-score03-2=3
| RD2-score03-3=6
| RD2-seed04=
| RD2-team04=
| RD2-score04-1=3
| RD2-score04-2=6
| RD2-score04-3=3

| RD2-seed05=16
| RD2-team05=
| RD2-score05-1=7
| RD2-score05-2=6
| RD2-score05-3=
| RD2-seed06=
| RD2-team06= K Barrois A Beck
| RD2-score06-1=5
| RD2-score06-2=1
| RD2-score06-3=

| RD2-seed07=WC
| RD2-team07= J Coin P Parmentier
| RD2-score07-1=6
| RD2-score07-2=5
| RD2-score07-3=6
| RD2-seed08=3
| RD2-team08= E Makarova E Vesnina
| RD2-score08-1=3
| RD2-score08-2=7
| RD2-score08-3=3

| RD3-seed01=
| RD3-team01= M Keys A Riske
| RD3-score01-1=66
| RD3-score01-2=6
| RD3-score01-3=1
| RD3-seed02=
| RD3-team02= L Hradecká M Krajicek
| RD3-score02-1=78
| RD3-score02-2=3
| RD3-score02-3=6

| RD3-seed03=16
| RD3-team03=

Section 4

References 
 Draw
2014 French Open – Women's draws and results at the International Tennis Federation

Women's Doubles
French Open by year – Women's doubles
2014 in women's tennis
2014 in French women's sport